Enterococcus hirae is a species of Enterococcus. Its type strain is NCDO 1258. It is involved in growth depression in young chickens and endocarditis and sepsis in humans.

References

Further reading
Epidemiology of Enterococcus: 
Genome sequence:

External links
Type strain of Enterococcus hirae at BacDive -  the Bacterial Diversity Metadatabase

hirae